Mebo Pendel Ipi is a former Papua New Guinean woman cricketer. She played for Papua New Guinea in the 2008 Women's Cricket World Cup Qualifier.

References

External links 
Profile at CricHQ

1979 births
Living people
Papua New Guinean women cricketers
Place of birth missing (living people)